Uhehlia is a genus of leaf beetles in the subfamily Eumolpinae. It is known from Africa. It was first described by the German entomologist Julius Weise in 1906 from Uhehe, a region now in Tanzania.

Species
 Uhehlia goetzei Kuntzen, 1912
 Uhehlia nerissidioides Kuntzen, 1912
 Uhehlia pardalis Weise, 1906
 Uhehlia uniformis Pic, 1939

References

Eumolpinae
Chrysomelidae genera
Beetles of Africa
Taxa named by Julius Weise